Whirinaki may refer to:

 Whirinaki, Northland
 Whirinaki, Hawke's Bay
 Whirinaki Te Pua-a-Tāne Conservation Park
 Whirinaki Power Station